Unbeliever's Script is the third studio album by the Polish death metal band Sceptic. The album was released on September 25, 2003 by Empire Records.

Track listing

Personnel

References

2003 albums
Sceptic (band) albums
Candlelight Records albums